This is a list in alphabetical order of cricketers who have played for Sussex County Cricket Club in top-class matches since it was founded in 1839. Like the Sussex county teams formed by earlier organisations, including the old Brighton Cricket Club, the county club is classified as an important team by substantial sources to 1894; classified as an official first-class team from 1895 by Marylebone Cricket Club (MCC) and the County Championship clubs; classified as a List A team since the beginning of limited overs cricket in 1963; and classified as a first-class Twenty20 team since the inauguration of the Twenty20 Cup in 2003. 

The details are the player's usual name followed by the years in which he was active as a Sussex player and then his name is given as it usually appears on match scorecards. Note that many players represented other top-class teams besides Sussex. Current players are shown as active to the latest season in which they played for the club. The list has been updated to the end of the 2021 cricket season using the data published in Playfair Cricket Annual, 2022 edition.

The list excludes Second XI and other players who did not play for the club's first team; and players whose first team appearances were in minor matches only. Players who represented the county before 1839 are included if they also played for the county club but excluded if not. All players known to have represented the county before the formation of the county club are included in List of Sussex county cricketers to 1839.

A

B

C

D

E

F

G

H

I
 Danial Ibrahim (2021) : D. K. Ibrahim
 Imran Khan (1977–1988) : Imran Khan
 Kevin Innes (2002–2004) : K. J. Innes
 Lionel Isherwood (1925–1927) : L. C. R. Isherwood
 John Isted (1853) : J. Isted

J

K

L

M

N

O
 Charles Oakes (1935–1954) : C. Oakes
 Jack Oakes (1937–1951) : J. Y. Oakes
 Alan Oakman (1947–1968) : A. S. M. Oakman
 William O'Byrne (1935–1942) : W. F. T. O'Byrne
 Denzil Roberts Onslow (1860–1869) : D. R. Onslow
 Ali Orr (2021) : A. G. H. Orr
 Henry Osborn (1848–1860) : H. Osborn

P

Q
 Frank Quaife (1928) : F. C. Quaife
 Walter Quaife (1884–1891) : W. Quaife
 Willie Quaife (1891) : W. G. Quaife

R

S

T

U
 Mark Upton (1971) : M. Upton

V
 Johan van der Wath (2005) : J. J. van der Wath
 Stiaan van Zyl (2017–2021) : S. van Zyl
 John Vidler (1910–1919) : J. L. S. Vidler
 Lou Vincent (2011) : L. Vincent
 John Vincett (1907–1919) : J. H. Vincett
 Joe Vine (1896–1922) : J. Vine
 Jason Voros (2004) : J. A. Voros

W

Y
 Michael Yardy (1999–2015) : M. H. Yardy
 Yasir Arafat (2006–2010) : Yasir Arafat
 John Young (1908) : J. V. Young
 Dick Young (1905–1925) : R. A. Young

Z
 Bastiaan Zuiderent (1999–2003) : B. Zuiderent

See also
 List of Sussex County Cricket Club captains

References

Bibliography
 
 

Players

Sussex
Cricketers